Saint Clare's Hospital is a former Catholic hospital, located in the Hell's Kitchen neighborhood of Manhattan, New York City. It operated from 1934 to 2007.

History
The hospital was founded in 1934 by the Franciscan Sisters of Allegany, based in upstate New York, to serve a working-class Manhattan neighborhood, composed largely of Italian and Irish immigrants to the United States. It provided basic nursing care; to help with this, a school of nursing was founded.

In an effort to respond better to the changing needs of the neighborhood, the hospital expanded from basic medical care to provide a wide range of services, especially in the field of social service. One example was the founding in 1977 of a small shelter solely for homeless women, called The Dwelling Place. It was established by a small group of Franciscan Sisters who took over an abandoned brownstone near the hospital in order to house these women, who often refused to stay in public shelters because they did not feel safe in them.

By the early 1980s the hospital had become St. Clare's Hospital and Health Center, and was operated by the Missionary Sisters of the Sacred Heart of Jesus. It had a capacity of 250 beds, as well as a small psychiatric unit of 12 beds.

Services provided
 Acute Renal Dialysis Services
 Alcohol And/Or Drug Services
 Ambulance (Owned) Services
 Anatomical Laboratory Services
 Anesthesia Services
 Blood Bank Services
 CT Scanner Services
 Cardio-Thoracic Surgery Services
 Clinical Laboratory Services
 Dedicated Emergency Department Services
 Dental Services
 Diagnostic Radiology Services
 Dietary Services
 Emergency Services
 ICU – Medical/Surgical Services
 Inpatient Surgical Services
 Magnetic Resonance Imaging (MRI) Services
 Neurology Inpatient, Outpatient and Electrophysiology Lab
 Nuclear Medicine Services
 Operating Room Services
 Outpatient Rehabilitation Services
 Outpatient Services
 Outpatient Surgery Unit Services
 Pharmacy Services
 Physical Therapy Services
 Podiatric Services
 Postoperative Recovery Room Services
 Psychiatric Services
 Respiratory Care Services
 Social Services

AIDS care
When AIDS began to emerge in the United States during the early 1980s, New York was one of the hardest-hit cities but had no specialized facility to address the patients' multiple needs. Despite his disagreements otherwise with the gay community, Archbishop John J. O'Connor approved the opening of such a facility at St. Clare's. It was the first hospital in New York to care for HIV/AIDS patients.Cardinal John O'Connor used to come in he evening and volunteered in the care of Patients afflicted with AIDS. St. Clare's had a prison unit to care for Prisoners with AIDS.

St. Vincent's Midtown Hospital
In 2003 the Franciscan Sisters came to the conclusion that they could no longer operate the hospital, due as much to the diminishing membership of the Congregation as to finances. Arrangements were made to transfer the hospital to the auspices of Saint Vincent's Catholic Medical Center, the oldest Catholic hospital in the city, located in the Greenwich Village neighborhood. The transfer was accomplished and the hospital was renamed St. Vincent's Midtown Hospital.

Closing
In 2005 the Governor of New York, George Pataki, established the Commission on Health Care Facilities in the 21st Century. Its goal was to evaluate the services and capacities of the hospitals in the state, in order to find ways of streamlining medical care and avoiding the duplication of services. Chaired by Stephen Berger, it was commonly referred to as the "Berger Commission".

The Commission determined that St. Vincent's Midtown Hospital was superfluous to the needs of the local community and ordered its closure. This took place on 31 August 2007.

In Media
St. Clare's Hospital and Health Center (address 408 West 52nd Street) was featured in the 1985 motion picture "Remo Williams: The Adventure Begins".  Scenes were shot in some interior rooms and the front entrance, visible at approximately 12 minutes 35 seconds into the film.

References

External links
 
 
 

Defunct hospitals in Manhattan
Hospitals established in 1934
Hospitals disestablished in 2007
1934 establishments in New York City
2007 disestablishments in New York (state)
Catholic hospitals in North America
Franciscan hospitals
Hell's Kitchen, Manhattan